Visitors to Tonga must obtain a visa unless they come from one of the visa exempt countries or countries eligible for visa on arrival. Visa applications must be sent to the Principal Immigration Officer in Nuku'alofa. All visitors must hold a passport valid for 6 months.

Visa policy map

Visa exemption
Holders of passports of the following 33 jurisdictions do not require a visa for entry to Tonga:

Visa on arrival

Citizens from following 36 countries and territories may obtain a free visa on arrival (valid for 31 days, extendable up to 6 months) to Tonga:

The same policy applies to holders of diplomatic or service passports of China.

Mutual visa waiver agreements
: Tonga signed a mutual visa-waiver agreement with the European Union on 20 November 2015 which was applied on a provisional basis as from the day following the date of signature and fully ratified on 8 June 2016. This agreement allows all citizens of states that are contracting parties to the Schengen Agreement to stay without a visa for a maximum period of 90 days in any 180-day period.
: Mutual visa-waiver agreement was signed between the Chinese and Tongan governments on June 9, 2016. The agreement allows citizens of the respective countries to stay for 30 days without a visa.
: Mutual visa-waiver agreement signed between the Israeli and Tongan governments has been in force since April 2017.
: A memorandum of understanding was signed in April 2018 and entered into force on 24 May 2018 allowing citizens of the United Arab Emirates holding all types of passports visa-free entry up to 60 days.

See also

Visa requirements for Tongan citizens

References

External links
 Consulate-General of Tonga in San Francisco
 EU and the Kingdom of Tonga sign the short-stay visa waiver Agreement, Ministry of Information & Communications of Tonga

Foreign relations of Tonga
Tonga